Caoyang Road is an interchange station between lines 3, 4, 11 and 14 of the Shanghai Metro, and is located in Putuo District.

The interchange wit Line 14 opened along with the Line on 30 Dec. 2021, which is the vertual interchange.

Station layout (Lines 3, 4 and 11)

Station layout (Line 14)

Gallery

References

Line 3, Shanghai Metro
Line 4, Shanghai Metro
Line 11, Shanghai Metro
Shanghai Metro stations in Putuo District
Railway stations in China opened in 2000
Railway stations in Shanghai
Line 14, Shanghai Metro